Lunay is a commune in the Loir-et-Cher department of central France.

Geography
The river Loir flows along the east and south edges of the commune for 8 km.

Lunay is bordered by Thoré-la-Rochette, Mazangé, Fortan, Savigny-sur-Braye, Fontaine-les-Coteaux, Montoire-sur-le-Loir, Les Roches-l'Évêque, and Saint-Rimay.

Population

See also
Communes of the Loir-et-Cher department

References

External links
 Official Web site 
 Lunay football 

Communes of Loir-et-Cher